En Avant Guingamp Féminines are a French football club based in Saint-Brieuc, a commune in the Brittany region. The club was previously the women's section of men's football club Stade Briochin and was founded in 1973 under the name Chaffoteaux Sports Saint-Brieuc. From 1999–2003, the club played under the name Saint-Brieuc Football Féminin, switching to Stade Briochin following the end of the 2002–03 season. The club currently plays in the Division 1 Féminine, the first division of women's football in France, and is coached by Frédéric Biancalani.

On 18 August 2011, the presidential hierarchy of men's professional club En Avant de Guingamp and Stade Briochin announced that the clubs reached an agreement on a merger, which will come into effect at the start of the 2011–12 season. Under the agreement, Stade Briochin will dissolve and play as the women's team of Guingamp. All other remnants of the club remain the same, such as its president, manager, and players.

Players

Current squad

Former internationals
 : Camille Abily, Marine Dafeur, Anne Gouezel, Françoise Jézéquel, Clarisse Le Bihan, Isabelle Le Boulch, Eugénie Le Sommer, Griedge Mbock Bathy, Mélissa Plaza, Solène Durand, 
 : Leïla Maknoun
: Desire Oparanozie

Honours

Domestic
 Division 1 Féminine (Champions of France) (level 1)
Winners (1) 1988–89,

References

External links
 Official website 

 
En Avant Guingamp
Women's football clubs in France
Association football clubs established in 1973
1973 establishments in France
Division 1 Féminine clubs
Football clubs in Brittany
Saint-Brieuc